Cornallis is a genus of beetles in the family Cerambycidae, containing the following species:

 Cornallis gracilipes Thomson, 1864
 Cornallis indica Breuning, 1969

References

Apomecynini
Cerambycidae genera